Hadensville is an unincorporated community in Goochland County, Virginia, United States. Hadensville has a post office with ZIP code 23067.

References

Unincorporated communities in Goochland County, Virginia
Unincorporated communities in Virginia